Robert R. Burman (April 23, 1884 – April 8, 1916) was an American race car driver, he was an open-wheel pioneer, setting numerous speed records in the early 1900s. He participated in many historic races and was one of the drivers to compete in the first edition of the Indianapolis 500 in 1911.

Biography
Burman was born in Imlay City, Michigan on April 23, 1884. While working as a road tester for Jackson Automobile Co. in 1906, he got the opportunity to enter in several races, in which he performed well. In 1908, William C. Durant the founder of General Motors brought Burman and the Chevrolet brothers on as drivers for the newly formed Buick racing team. 

Burman won the Prest-O-Lite Trophy Race in his Buick in 1909, the precursor to the Indy 500. He finished first in the 1909 Vesper Club Trophy Race driving for the Buick team and fourth in the 1909 Lowell Trophy Race. In 1910 Burman won the Remy Brassard Trophy 2 on the Indianapolis Motor Speedway. In 1911, Burman won the first four events at the New Orleans Mardi Gras Races with his Buick 60 Special.

Racing for racing promoter Ernest Moross, Burman set a land speed record at an average of 141.732 mph over a 1km distance in his 200-horsepower Blitzen Benz racecar on the sands of Daytona Beach on 23 April 1911, his land speed record was however not officially recognized by the AIACR in Paris. He competed at the first ever 1911 Indianapolis 500 in a Benz, before the race he made exhibition runs in the Blitzen Benz on the Indianapolis Motor Speedway and set speed records at the quarter mile, half mile, kilometer and mile distances. He was crowned speed king before the start of the race. 

He competed at the 1912 Indianapolis 500 where he crashed his Cutting car after 157 laps in the second turn. Burman started the 1913 Indianapolis 500 as the favorite, and led 41 laps early, but his car caught fire on lap 55, he was able to repair his Keeton and continue for a while, but eventually didn't finish the race. In 1914 he won the Kalamazoo Race, and in 1915 he won both the Oklahoma Southern Sweepstakes Road Race and the Burlington Race in his Peugeot L76. He finished sixth in the 1915 Indianapolis 500.

Death
On 8 April 1916, Bob Burman was killed during the Corona road race when one of his rear tires exploded and his open-cockpit Peugeot car rolled over, along with his riding mechanic Erick Schrader and a policeman on duty.  Three spectators were also killed, and five others were seriously injured.  His death caused his friends Barney Oldfield and Harry Arminius Miller to join forces to build a race car that incorporated a roll cage inside a streamlined driver's compartment that completely enclosed the driver.  It was called the Golden Submarine.

Awards
He was inducted in the National Sprint Car Hall of Fame in 2011.

Indianapolis 500 results

Images

References

External links

1884 births
1916 deaths
People from Imlay City, Michigan
Sportspeople from Metro Detroit
Racing drivers from Michigan
Indianapolis 500 drivers
AAA Championship Car drivers
Racing drivers who died while racing
Sports deaths in California
National Sprint Car Hall of Fame inductees